The SV-328 is an 8-bit home computer introduced by Spectravideo in June 1983. It was the business-targeted model of the Spectravideo range, sporting a compact full-travel keyboard with numeric keypad. It had 80 KB RAM (64 KB available for software, remaining 16 KB video memory), a respectable amount for its time. Other than the keyboard and RAM, this machine was identical to its little brother, the SV-318.

The SV-328 is the design on which the MSX standard was based. Spectravideo's MSX-compliant successor to the 328, the SV-728, looks almost identical, the only immediately noticeable differences being a larger cartridge slot in the central position (to fit MSX standard cartridges), lighter shaded keyboard and the MSX badging.

Reference to the operating system Microsoft Extended BASIC is not to be confused with MSX BASIC, although some marketing at the time claimed that Microsoft Extended is what MSX stood for. More than 130 games were released for the system.

System specs
Processor: Zilog Z80A running at 3.6 MHz
ROM: 32 KB
BIOS (16 KB)
BASIC (16 KB)
RAM: 64 KB
Video Display Processor: TMS9918
VRAM: 16 KB
Text modes: 40×24 and 32×24
Resolution: 256×192 (16 colours)
Sprites: 32, 1 colour, max 4 per horizontal line
Sound chip: General Instrument AY-3-8910 (PSG)
I/O chip: Intel 8255

Peripherals

The standard ports of a SV-318 / SV-328 support only a few peripherals such as the SV-903 tape drive, a CVBS monitor (or external RF modulator for TV), and two joysticks. However the Super Expander edge connector offered more options:

SV-803 Memory expansion card, 16 KB
SV-807 Memory expansion card, 64 KB
SV-805 RS-232 card
SV-701 Internal modem, 300 baud
SV-802 Centronics parallel port card for printer
SV-806 80-column video card
SV-801 Floppy controller card, needed for disk drive usage
Hard disk controller card
SV-809 Network card
SV-602 Mini Expander (for one card)
SV-601A Expander case with power supply and many slots. External disk drives
SV-601B Super Expander, similar but with built-in floppy drive and an optional second drive
SV-603 ColecoVision adapter, enabling ColecoVision games to be played on the SV-328
SV-901C 80-columns printer at 50 cps (a refurbished Seikosha SK-100)
SV-902 External floppy drive
SV-903 cassette drive
SV-105 Graphics Tablet

References

External links
SV-328 at Roger's Spectravideo page
El Museo de los 8 Bits
old-computers

Emulators
SVI-318/328 Emulator by Jimmy Mårdell
BlueMSX MSX emulator, support SVI 318/328

Home computers
MSX